Andreas Albinowski (10 Dec 1640 - 30 May 1695) was a Roman Catholic prelate who served as Auxiliary Bishop of Włocławek (1695–?)

Biography
Andreas Albinowski was born in Moscicen on 10 Dec 1640. He was ordained a deacon on 8 Apr 1670 and a priest on 13 Apr 1670. On 30 May 1695, he was appointed during the papacy of Pope Innocent XII as Auxiliary Bishop of Włocławek and Titular Bishop of Ordaea. It is uncertain how long he served; the next auxiliary bishop of record was Wojciech Ignacy Bardziński who was appointed in 1709.

References 

17th-century Roman Catholic bishops in the Polish–Lithuanian Commonwealth
Bishops appointed by Pope Innocent XII
1640 births
1695 deaths